Lee Adamson (born 27 June 1946) is a former Australian rules footballer who played in the Victorian Football League (VFL).

From Greensborough, Adamson came through the Collingwood Football Club's under 19s before getting into the senior side. He made his debut in 1966 as a slender defender. His main concern halfway through his career when he couldn't get a game due to successive injuries, but worked back and played in the 1970 Grand Final against premiers Carlton. Adamson was at the front of a racial abuse accusation when he was a victim of a striking charge from Carlton's Syd Jackson. 22 years later, Jackson admitted no racial abuse was committed.

After he retired in 1973, Adamson was a support coach at Victoria Park.

References 

1946 births
Living people
Australian rules footballers from Victoria (Australia)
Collingwood Football Club players
Greensborough Football Club players